The Perfectionist is a play and telemovie by David Williamson about an academic who is working on a PhD. His wife hires a Danish student to babysit their children.

Film version

In 1983 Patricia Lovell announced plans to produce a film version of the play directed by Williamson but they were unable to finance it. A telemovie was made in 1985. The telemovie was subsequently sold in multiple international territories, but also for television and direct-to-video.

References

External links

David Williamson's The Perfectionist at Ozmovies

Plays by David Williamson
1982 plays
Australian plays adapted into films
1985 films
Australian comedy films
Films based on works by David Williamson
Films directed by Chris Thomson (director)
1980s English-language films
1980s Australian films